Stephanie Brewster Brewer Taylor Alexander is an American mathematician, a professor emerita of mathematics at the University of Illinois at Urbana–Champaign. Her research concerns differential geometry and metric spaces.

Education and career
Alexander earned her Ph.D. from UIUC in 1967, under the supervision of Richard L. Bishop, with a thesis entitled Reducibility of Euclidean Immersions of Low Codimensions. After joining the UIUC faculty as a half-time instructor, she became a regular faculty member in 1972. She retired in 2009.

Books
With Vitali Kapovitch and Anton Petrunin, Alexander is the author of the book An Invitation to Alexandrov Geometry: CAT(0) Spaces (Springer, 2019).

Recognition
At Illinois, Alexander won the Luckman Distinguished Undergraduate Teaching Award and the William Prokasy Award for Excellence in Undergraduate Teaching in 1993.
In 2014 she was elected as a fellow of the American Mathematical Society "for contributions to geometry, for high-quality exposition, and for exceptional teaching of mathematics."

References

External links
Home page

Year of birth missing (living people)
Living people
20th-century American mathematicians
21st-century American mathematicians
American women mathematicians
University of Illinois College of Liberal Arts and Sciences alumni
University of Illinois Urbana-Champaign faculty
Fellows of the American Mathematical Society
20th-century women mathematicians
21st-century women mathematicians
Differential geometers
20th-century American women
21st-century American women